Overthorpe  may refer to:
Overthorpe, Northamptonshire
Overthorpe, West Yorkshire
Overthorpe (Double Bay)